John Sevier is an census-designated place in central-eastern Knox County, Tennessee, United States. The John Sevier Yard, a multi-track rail yard operated by Norfolk Southern Railway, is located just south of the community in the Knoxville city limits.

The population of the CDP was 1,026 at the 2020 census.

Demographics

References

Census-designated places in Knox County, Tennessee
Census-designated places in Tennessee